Ministers in the New Zealand Government are members of Parliament (MPs) who hold ministerial warrants from the Crown to perform certain functions of government. This includes formulating and implementing policies and advising the governor-general. Ministers collectively make up the executive branch of the New Zealand state. The governor-general is obliged to follow the advice of the prime minister on the appointment and dismissal of ministers.

Most ministers sit in Cabinet and all, including non-Cabinet ministers, serve concurrently as councillors of the Executive Council of New Zealand. These executives are also formally titled "ministers of the Crown", as in other Commonwealth realms.

Terminology
"Minister of the Crown" is the formal title used in Commonwealth realms to describe a minister of the reigning sovereign or governor-general. "The Crown" vaguely refers to both the sovereign and the state.  In New Zealand, an adviser to the sovereign or governor-general is also referred to simply by the term minister, but the formal title is used in the New Zealand Cabinet Manual.

Appointment and dismissal 

The appointment of an MP as a minister is formally made by the governor-general, who must sign a ministerial warrant before it officially comes into effect. The governor-general appoints the prime minister (head of government) on the basis of whether they are able to command the confidence of Parliament. The prime minister will advise the governor-general on the appointment or dismissal of other ministers. The first appointments are made whenever a new government takes office, and thereafter whenever a vacancy arises (due to a minister being dismissed or resigning). Each minister takes an oath (or affirmation) of office.

The recommendations that the prime minister chooses to give are theoretically their own affair, but the political party (or parties) behind them will almost certainly have views on the matter, and most recommendations are made only after negotiation and bargaining. Different parties have different mechanisms for this – the Labour Party, for example, has provision for its parliamentary caucus to select ministers, while the National Party allows the prime minister to select ministers at their discretion.

Responsibilities and powers
The formal powers of the executive are exercised through the Executive Council, which consists of all ministers, and is headed by the governor-general. When the Executive Council resolves to issue an order, and the order is signed by the governor-general, it becomes legally binding.

At the same time as they are appointed to the Executive Council, a minister is generally charged with supervising a particular aspect of the government's activities, known as a "portfolio", such as the provision of health services (minister of health) or the upkeep of law enforcement (minister of police). A minister with portfolio is also responsible for a corresponding public sector organisation, usually known as a department or ministry. 

A warrant from the Crown is a formal written authority that is granted by the governor-general to a minister. The warrant sets out the minister's responsibilities, powers, and duties within their portfolio. It is essentially a legal document that gives a minister the authority to carry out their duties, and is necessary for them to be able to exercise the powers and functions of their portfolio. 

Ministers without portfolio are MPs appointed as minister without a specific role. Such appointments have become rare today, although sometimes an MP may be appointed to a sinecure portfolio such as "minister of state" for similar purposes.

Individual ministerial responsibility is a constitutional convention that a minister is ultimately responsible for the decisions and actions (and the consequences that follow) of individuals and organisations for which they have ministerial responsibility. Individual ministerial responsibility is not the same as cabinet collective responsibility, which states members of Cabinet must approve publicly of its collective decisions or resign.

History 

Originally, the Executive Council functioned as an advisory group to the governor, and ministerial functions were performed by appointed officials, not politicians. The various "ministers" serving on the Council, such as the Colonial Secretary (Andrew Sinclair from 1844) and the Colonial Treasurer (Alexander Shepherd from 1842), reported to the Governor. When Parliament was established, however, many believed that they would soon replace these appointed officials, with ministerial positions being given to members of Parliament instead. The Acting Governor, Robert Wynyard, did not agree, however, saying that the levers of government could not be turned over to Parliament without approval from United Kingdom of Great Britain and Ireland. The issue was controversial, and ended with the Acting Governor attempting (with only partial success) to suspend the 1st New Zealand Parliament.

Later, in the 2nd New Zealand Parliament, Parliament was victorious, and the first political ministers were appointed in the 1856 Sewell Ministry. Henry Sewell became Colonial Secretary, Dillon Bell became Colonial Treasurer, Frederick Whitaker became Attorney-General, and Henry Tancred became a minister without portfolio. Since then, all ministers have been appointed from among the ranks of Parliament.

Later, Parliament made further gains, with the convention being established that the governor-general's actions in the Executive Council were bound by the advice that ministers gave. Today, the Executive Council is not used for deliberation—rather, Cabinet is the forum for debate. Cabinet is a separate meeting of most (but usually not all) government ministers, and formally presents proposals to the whole Executive Council only when a decision has already been reached.

Ranking
The prime minister ranks the Cabinet ministers to determine seniority, or the "pecking order". This ranking depends on factors such as length of service, the relative prominence of a portfolio, and "personal standing with the prime minister". Lists of ministers are often ordered according to each individual minister's ranking.

Prominent ministerial positions
Prime Minister
Deputy Prime Minister
Minister of Agriculture
Minister of Conservation
Minister of Defence
Minister of Education
Minister of Finance
Minister of Foreign Affairs
Minister of Health
Minister of Internal Affairs
Minister of Justice
Minister for Māori Development
Minister of Social Development
Attorney-General

List of current portfolios
 the following ministerial portfolios exist. Many ministers hold multiple positions.

See also 
Parliamentary under-secretary

Notes

References

Citations

Sources 

 

 

Constitution of New Zealand
Public office-holders in New Zealand